Gun Nathalie Björn (born 4 May 1997) is a Swedish professional footballer who plays as a defender for Everton and the Swedish women's national team.

Career statistics
Scores and results list Sweden's goal tally first, score column indicates score after each Björn goal.

Honours
Sweden U19
 UEFA Women's Under-19 Championship: 2015

Sweden U17
 UEFA Women's Under-17 Championship runner-up: 2013

Private life 
Björn lives together with Italian footballer Aurora Galli in a same-sex relationship.

References

External links 
 
 
 
 
https://www.evertonfc.com/news/2187253/bjorn-joins-everton

1997 births
Living people
Swedish women's footballers
IK Sirius Fotboll players
AIK Fotboll (women) players
Eskilstuna United DFF players
Damallsvenskan players
Women's association football defenders
2019 FIFA Women's World Cup players
Sweden women's international footballers
FC Rosengård players
Footballers at the 2020 Summer Olympics
Olympic footballers of Sweden
Olympic medalists in football
Medalists at the 2020 Summer Olympics
Olympic silver medalists for Sweden
Footballers from Uppsala
UEFA Women's Euro 2022 players
Swedish LGBT sportspeople
LGBT association football players
Lesbian sportswomen
21st-century Swedish LGBT people